Wissahickon is a historic apartment building in the Germantown, Philadelphia.

Wissahickon, which takes its name from nearby Wissahickon Creek, was listed on the National Register of Historic Places in 1983. It was listed on the Philadelphia Register of Historic Places on August 6, 1981.

References

External links
Listing at Philadelphia Architects and Buildings

Residential buildings on the National Register of Historic Places in Philadelphia
Georgian architecture in Pennsylvania
Houses completed in 1911
Philadelphia Register of Historic Places
East Falls, Philadelphia